A list of the earliest films produced in the Cinema of Spain, ordered by year of release from 1897 to 1929. For an alphabetical list of articles on Spanish films, see :Category:Spanish films.

1897-1929

External links
 Spanish film at the Internet Movie Database

1890s
Lists of 1890s films
Films
Lists of 1900s films
Films
Lists of 1910s films
Films
Lists of 1920s films
Films